Linda Putnam is an American scholar and professor in the department of communication at the University of California, Santa Barbara. She is known for her theories on organizational communication, centered on conflict management and negotiation, solutions within organizations, gender studies in organizations, and organizational space.

Putnam has performed studies on instructors, multiparty environmental disputes, negotiation teams, and labor conflicts. Her discourse studies primarily are focused heavily on tensions and contradictions and also incorporate metaphors, narratives, discursive framing, and arguments. Putnam's work also focuses on the contradictions and interactions within the field of work-life issues within organizations, organizational development and work inside of open office environments.

Education 
Putnam attended Hardin-Simmons University, where she graduated with a Bachelor of Arts in speech communication in 1967. One year later she was awarded a Master of Arts from the University of Wisconsin-Madison and in 1977, received a Ph.D. in speech communications with a minor in management and psychology from the University of Minnesota.

Career
Putnam began teaching in 1977 at Purdue University.  In 1993, she joined the faculty in Texas A&M University's department of speech communication and later became the department's head. Her courses focus on a variety of topics that include communication and conflict management, discourse analysis in organizations, and gender and organizations. In 2006 Putnam was recognized as a Regents' Professor at Texas A&M for her research and teaching. The following year Putnam took a position with the University of California Santa Barbara's communications department, where she serves as a Distinguished Research Professor Emerita.

Communication theory and research
Putnam's research focuses mainly on breaking down group communication through the understanding of conflict, contradictions, and negotiations inside of organizations such as the 2007-2008 Writers Guild Strike. Her more current research has taken her into "conflict framing in multiparty environmental disputes, especially in the ways that different stakeholders make sense of complex, seemingly intractable conflicts"(LINK)

Theory of Organization Development Through the lens of Paradox
Expanded upon by Linda Putnam the theory of organizational development is centered on breaking down the pathways that allow and organization to form and grow. Linda Putnam looks at Organizational Development and expands the idea of Paradoxical thinking. Using a Postmodernist approach this Theory focuses on the idea that modern Organizational Development leaves holes that are created by contradictions and dialectics. Through a feminist view, it is possible to use this theory to create new avenues for discussion on gendered identities within an organization that can lead to tensions. The theory supports the idea that tackling these cultural paradoxes will allow for new identities and organizations to be created.

Awards and honors

 2011 Distinguished Service Award from the Academy of Management Association
 2012 Samuel L. Becker Distinguished Service Award from National Communication Association
 2021 Doctorat honoris causa from the Université de Montréal.

Selected publications

 Örtenblad, A., Trehan, K., & Putnam, L. L. (Eds.). (2017). Exploring Morgan’s Metaphors: Theory, Research, and
Practice. Los Angeles, CA: Sage Publications, 260 pp.
 Putnam, L. L., & Mumby, D.K. (Eds.). (2014). The SAGE Handbook of Organizational Communication: Advances
in Theory, Research, and Methods (3rd ed.). Los Angeles, CA: Sage Publications, 837 pp.
 Grant, D., Hardy, C., & Putnam, L. L. (Eds.). (2011). Organizational Discourse Studies (3 volume set). Sage Major
Works Series. Los Angeles, CA: Sage Publications. Vol. 1—373,pp.;Vol. 2—442 pp.;, Vol. 3—427 pp.
 Putnam, L. L., & Nicotera, A. M. (Eds.). (2009). Building Theories of Organizations: The Constitutive Role of
Communication. New York: Routledge/Taylor Francis, 222 pp.
 Putnam, L. L., & Krone, K. J. (Eds.). (2006). Organizational Communication (5 volume set). Sage Major Works
Series. London: Sage Publications. Vol. 1-- 410, pp.; Vol. 2-- 358 pp., Vol. 3--90 pp.; Vol. 4--399 pp.; Vol. 5-
-406 pp.
 Grant, D., Hardy, C., Oswick, C., & Putnam, L. (Eds.). (2004). The SAGE Handbook of Organizational Discourse.
London, Sage, 911 pp.

References 

Living people
Year of birth missing (living people)
University of California, Santa Barbara faculty